Burston and Shimpling is a civil parish in the county of Norfolk, England. It includes the village of Burston and Shimpling.

The Church of St George, Shimpling, is one of 124 existing round-tower churches in Norfolk. It is in care of the Churches Conservation Trust.

Notes

External links

Website with photos of Shimpling St George

Civil parishes in Norfolk
South Norfolk